Human coronavirus 229E (HCoV-229E) is a species of coronavirus which infects humans and bats. It is an enveloped, positive-sense, single-stranded RNA virus which enters its host cell by binding to the APN receptor. Along with Human coronavirus OC43 (a member of the Betacoronavirus genus), it is one of the viruses responsible for the common cold. HCoV-229E is a member of the genus Alphacoronavirus and subgenus Duvinacovirus.

Transmission
HCoV-229E transmits via droplet-respiration and fomites.

Signs and symptoms
However, such high morbidity outcomes are almost always seen in cases with co-infection with other respiratory pathogens; there is a single published case report to date of a 229E infection that caused acute respiratory distress syndrome (ARDS) in an otherwise healthy patient having no detectable co-infection with another pathogen. HCoV-229E is also among the coronaviruses most frequently codetected with other respiratory viruses, particularly with human respiratory syncytial virus (HRSV).

Epidemiology
HCoV-229E is one of the seven human coronaviruses which include HCoV-NL63, HCoV-OC43, HCoV-HKU1, 
MERS-CoV, SARS-CoV-1, and SARS-CoV-2 and are globally distributed. However, the viruses were detected in different parts of the world at different times of the year. A NCBI-study found a previous HCoV-229E infection in 42.9% – 50.0% of children of 6–12 months of age and in 65% of those 2.5–3.5 years of age.

Virology
HCoV-229E is one of seven known coronaviruses to infect humans. The other six are:
Human coronavirus NL63 (HCoV-NL63)
Human coronavirus OC43 (HCoV-OC43)
Human coronavirus HKU1 (HCoV-HKU1)
Middle East respiratory syndrome-related coronavirus (MERS-CoV)
Severe acute respiratory syndrome coronavirus (SARS-CoV-1)
Severe acute respiratory syndrome coronavirus 2 (SARS-CoV-2)

Research

Chloroquine, a zinc ionophore, inhibits the replication of Human coronavirus 229E in cell culture.

Human HCoV-229E, and human HCoV-NL63, likely originated from bats.

History 
A researcher at the University of Chicago, Dorothy Hamre, first identified 229E in 1965.

See also
Virulence
Outbreak
RNA virus
Human coronavirus HKU1
Positive/negative-sense

References

External links

 CDC
 Virology online
 Coronaviruses
 Viralzone: Alphacoronavirus 
 Virus Pathogen Database and Analysis Resource (ViPR): Coronaviridae

Alphacoronaviruses
Viral respiratory tract infections